Lehman may refer to:

People 
 Lehman (surname)
 Lehman Engel (1910–1982), American composer and conductor of Broadway musicals, television and film
 Lehman Kahn (1827–1915), Belgian educationalist and writer

Places and physical features
 Abbotsford-Mount Lehman, a Canadian electoral district
 Lehman Township, Pennsylvania (disambiguation), either of two places
 Lehman Caves, in Great Basin National Park in Nevada

Institutions and organizations
 Lehman High School (disambiguation), any of several schools
 Lake-Lehman Junior/Senior High School, in Pennsylvania
 Lehman Alternative Community School, in Ithaca, New York
 Lehman Brothers, a global financial services firm which declared bankruptcy in 2008
 Lehman College, a constituent college of the City University of New York
 Lehman's Hardware, a retail store in Ohio, specialized in products used by the Amish

Business and finance
 Lehman Formula
 Lehman Wave

See also 
 Lehmann
 Lemann
 Layman's terms